Stadionul CFR is a multi-purpose stadium in Simeria, Romania. It is currently used mostly for football matches, is the home ground of CFR Simeria and has a capacity of 2,000 seats.

References

External links
Stadionul CFR (Simeria) at soccerway.com

Football venues in Romania
Sport in Hunedoara County
Buildings and structures in Hunedoara County